Jafar Khan or Jafar Khan Zand, was the seventh shah (king) of the Zand dynasty from 1785 to 1789.

Jafar Khan may also refer to:

Jafar Khan Jamali (1911–1967), Pakistani politician and tribal chief
Jafar Khan (Gujarat Sultanate), son of Ahmad Shah I, King of Gujarat Sultanate
Jafar Qoli Khan, cousin and successor of Abbas Qoli Khan Kangarli of the Nakhichevan Khanate

See also
Jafarkhan, Kurdistan, or Ja‘far Khānī, a village in Khvor Khvoreh Rural District, Ziviyeh District, Saqqez County, Kurdistan Province, Iran
Deh-e Mir Jafar Khan, a village in Jahanabad Rural District, in the Central District of Hirmand County, Sistan and Baluchestan Province, Iran